Pecteilis is a genus of flowering plants from the orchid family, Orchidaceae. It is widespread across eastern and southern Asia including the Russian Far East, China, Japan, India, Pakistan, Indochina, and Indonesia.

Species

See also
 List of Orchidaceae genera

References

  2005. Handbuch der Orchideen-Namen. Dictionary of Orchid Names. Dizionario dei nomi delle orchidee. Ulmer, Stuttgart

External links
 
 

 
Orchideae genera
Orchids of Asia